Robert Temple Armstrong, Baron Armstrong of Ilminster,  (30 March 1927 – 3 April 2020) was a British civil servant and life peer.

Family
Armstrong was born in Headington on 30 March 1927, the only son of the musician Sir Thomas H. W. Armstrong and his wife Hester M. Draper, who were married in the City of London in 1926. His sister Helen was born in Exeter in 1930. 

Armstrong was educated at the Dragon School and then at Eton College, where he was a King's Scholar, following which he went up to Christ Church, Oxford, where he read Greats.

In Wantage, on 25 July 1953, Armstrong married Serena Mary Benedicta Chance, daughter of Sir Roger James Ferguson Chance, and Mary Georgina Rowney. Armstrong and his wife had two daughters, both born in Marylebone, Jane Orlanda Armstrong, born 1954, and Teresa Brigid Armstrong, born 1957.   This marriage ended in divorce, and in 1985 he married Mary Patricia Carlow, daughter of Charles Cyril Carlow.

Career
In a long civil service career, Armstrong worked in several departments, including HM Treasury and the Home Office. From 1970 to 1975 he served as the Principal Private Secretary to Prime Ministers Ted Heath and Harold Wilson.  He was knighted in 1978.  From 1979 to 1987, he served as Cabinet Secretary under Margaret Thatcher.

Armstrong was appointed a Companion of the Order of the Bath (CB) in 1974, a Commander of the Royal Victorian Order (CVO) in the 1975 Birthday Honours. In the 1978 Birthday Honours he was promoted to Knight Commander of the Order of the Bath (KCB) and to Knight Grand Cross (GCB) in the 1983 New Year Honours.

Spycatcher trial
In 1986, Armstrong was the key witness for the British Government as it sought to suppress the publication of Spycatcher, in which it alleged its author, Peter Wright, had attempted to disclose confidential information. At the time Wright was a retired high-ranking member of MI5 and was about to publish his book in Australia. The evidence given by Armstrong was widely ridiculed by the British press for its absurd ambiguity and seemingly deceptive nature. Wright's lawyer, Malcolm Turnbull, who later became the Prime Minister of Australia, was ultimately successful in lifting the publication ban. Turnbull described Armstrong as being like "Sir Humphrey Appleby" from Yes, Minister and said "If he is an honest man, then he appears rather like a well-educated mushroom".

He is credited with bringing the phrase "economical with the truth" into popular usage, after he used it during the Spycatcher trial in 1986; his use of the phrase was subsequently included in the Oxford Dictionary of Quotations.

Later life 
He was created a life peer as Baron Armstrong of Ilminster, of Ashill in the County of Somerset, on 26 February 1988, and sat as a crossbencher.

From 1994 to 2006, Lord Armstrong was Chancellor of the University of Hull. He was chairman of the Sir Edward Heath Charitable Foundation until 2013.

Allegations of child abuse 'coverup'
Armstrong was aware of Sir Peter Hayman's paedophilia, and after leaving office, commented "Clearly, I was aware of it at the time but I was not concerned with the personal aspect of it."

Armstrong gave Margaret Thatcher what he called a "veiled" warning not to sanction Jimmy Savile's knighthood for charitable work, due to allegations around his "misbehaviour with women (though not allegations of child abuse)".

In popular culture
Armstrong has been portrayed by the following actors in film and television productions:
 Rupert Vansittart in the 2002 BBC production of Ian Curteis's controversial The Falklands Play.
 Timothy West in the 2004 BBC production of The Alan Clark Diaries.

Death
Armstrong died on 3 April 2020 at the age of 93.

Bibliography
 (1997). The Future of the National Art Library: A Pamphlet Concerning the Victoria and Albert Museum's Responsibility Towards the Documentation of the History of Art and Design

Arms

See also
Baron Armstrong

References

External links

 

1927 births
2020 deaths
Armstrong of Ilminster, Robert Armstrong, Baron
Permanent Under-Secretaries of State for the Home Department
Civil servants in HM Treasury
Cabinet Secretaries (United Kingdom)
Private secretaries in the British Civil Service
People educated at The Dragon School
People educated at Eton College
Alumni of Christ Church, Oxford
Knights Grand Cross of the Order of the Bath
Commanders of the Royal Victorian Order
People associated with the University of Hull
Principal Private Secretaries to the Prime Minister
Life peers created by Elizabeth II